The 1984 French Open boys' singles tournament was an event during the 1984 French Open tennis tournament. Stefan Edberg was the defending champion, but did not compete in the Juniors in this year.

Kent Carlsson won in the final 6–3, 6–3, against Mark Kratzmann.

Seeds

  Kent Carlsson (champion)
  Boris Becker (semifinals)
  Brad Pearce (first round)
  Patrick McEnroe (second round)
  Thomas Muster (third round)
  Mark Kratzmann (final)
  François Errard (second round)
  Bruno Orešar (first round)
  Marius Masencamp (first round)
  Christian Miniussi (second round)
  Éric Winogradsky (first round)
  Nevio Devide (first round)
  Michihiro Ohta (second round)
  N/A
  Jaime Yzaga (first round)
  Felix Barrientos (first round)

Draw

Finals

Top half

Section 1

Section 2

Bottom half

Section 3

Section 4

References

Boys' Singles
1984